Jack Drake is a fictional character in Batman.

Jack Drake is also the name of:

Jack Drake (politician) (1934–2015), Iowa State Representative
Jack Drake (footballer) (1904–1941), Australian rules footballer

See also
John Drake (disambiguation)